Hong Kong University Press is the university press of the University of Hong Kong. It was established in 1956 and publishes more than 50 titles per year in both Chinese and English. Most works in English are on cultural studies, film and media studies, Chinese history and culture.

Brief 
Hong Kong University Press was established in 1956. At the beginning of the establishment, the press mainly published several books on studies done by the university's own faculty every year. It now releases between 30 and 60 new titles a year. All HKUP publications are approved by a committee of HKU faculty and staff, which bases its decisions on the results of a rigorous peer-review process. HKUP publishes most of its books (especially the academic books) in English and also brings out a lot of titles in Chinese. Also, since the first publication, HKUP has used a bilingual (Chinese and English) publication program.

Authors originate from various countries on multiple continents. In all areas of Asian research, the research direction of publications is mainly based on cultural studies, film and media researches, and Chinese history and cultures. HKUP also provides publications in law, education, social work, medicine, real estate, construction, linguistics, and language studies.

References

External links

 Official site (hkupress.hku.hk/)
About Hong Kong University Press - History and Mission

University presses of Hong Kong
University of Hong Kong